The 1988–89 Liga Artzit season saw Hapoel Ramat Gan win the title and promotion to Liga Leumit. At the other end of the table, Hapoel Bat Yam and Hapoel Yehud relegated to Liga Alef. However, after the season finished Beitar Ramla was found guilty in match fixing and was relegated to Liga Alef while Hapoel Bat Yam was reprieved.

At the end of the season, Liga Artzit expanded from 14 to 16 clubs, as Liga Leumit reduced in size from 14 to 12 clubs.

Final table

Promotion group

Relegation group

See also
1988–89 Liga Leumit

References

Liga Artzit seasons
Israel
2